Roderick W. Edmonds (August 20, 1919 – August 8, 1985) was a master sergeant of the 106th Infantry Division, 422nd Infantry Regiment in the United States Army during World War II, who was captured and became the ranking U.S. non-commissioned officer at the Stalag IX-A prisoner-of-war camp in Germany, whereat the risk of his lifehe saved an estimated 200-300 Jews from being singled out from the camp for Nazi persecution and possible death.

For his defense of Jewish servicemen at the POW camp, Edmonds, a Christian, was awarded the title "Righteous Among the Nations", Israel's highest award for non-Jews who risked their own lives to save Jews during the Holocaust. Of 25,000 people to receive the award, Edmonds was the fifth of five Americans, and the only one of the five who was an active serviceman during World War II. His service was the subject of a speech by President Barack Obama at the Israeli Embassy in Washington.<ref name="knoxville_2017_02_13_commercial_appeal"

Biography

Family and early life 
Roderick W. "Roddie" Edmonds was born in 1919 in South Knoxville, Tennessee, and graduated from Knoxville High in 1938.  Some sources, including the 1930 Federal census and the posthumous act awarding him the Congressional Gold Medal, spell his given name "Rodrick." He had three brothers: Thomas "Shake" Edmonds Jr., Leon Edmonds, and Robert Edmonds. He grew up attending a Methodist church in South Knoxville. He was married three times, the first two marriages ending in divorce: Marie Solomon (1942); Pauline Flora Surratt (1948); Mary Ann Watson (1953), to whom he was married at the time of his death. He had two sons: Kim Michael and Christopher W. Edmonds.

World War II 
Edmonds enlisted in the Army on March 17, 1941, at Fort Oglethorpe in Georgia.

Edmonds, along with other inexperienced troops, arrived in the European Theater of Operations in December 1944, with the 106th Infantry Division, arriving only five days before Germany launched a massive counteroffensive, the Battle of the Bulge. During the battle, on December 19, 1944, Edmonds was captured and sent to Stalag IX-B, a German prisoner-of-war (POW) camp. Shortly thereafter, he was transferred, with other enlisted personnel, to another POW camp near Ziegenhain, Germany: Stalag IX-A. As the senior noncommissioned officer at the new camp, Master Sergeant Edmonds was responsible for the camp's 1,275 American POWs.

On their first day in Stalag IX-A, January 27, 1945—as Germany's defeat was clearly approaching—Commandant Siegmann ordered Edmonds to tell only the Jewish-American soldiers to present themselves at the next morning's assembly so they could be separated from the other prisoners.

Instead, Edmonds ordered all 1,275 POWs to assemble outside their barracks. The German commandant rushed up to Edmonds in a fury, placed his pistol against Edmonds's head and demanded that he identify the Jewish soldiers under his command. Instead, Edmonds responded, "We are all Jews here," and told the commandant that if he wanted to shoot the Jews he would have to shoot all of the prisoners. He then warned the commandant that if he harmed any of Edmonds' men, the commandant would be prosecuted for war crimes after the conflict ended—since the Geneva Conventions required prisoners to give only their name, rank, and serial number; religion was not required. The commandant backed down.

Edmonds' actions are credited with saving up to 300 Jewish-American soldiers from possible death.

After 100 days of captivity, Edmonds returned home after the war, but kept the event at the POW camp to himself.

Postwar life
Edmonds never told his family of the event at the POW camp. He was again recruited to service during the Korean War. After returning from Korea, he worked variously for The Knoxville Journal and in sales related to mobile homes and cable television.

He died in 1985, never having received any official recognition, citation or medal for his defense of the Jewish POWs.

Posthumous recognition 

After his death in 1985, Edmonds' wife gave his son, Chris Edmonds, a couple of the diaries his father had kept while in the POW camp. Chris Edmonds, a Baptist minister, began researching his story, and stumbled upon a mention of the event at the POW camp. He located several of the Jewish soldiers his father saved, who provided witness statements to Yad Vashem. Among the Jewish-American POW servicemen who were saved was Sonny Fox, an American television host and executive, who witnessed and later recounted Edmonds' actions.

On 10 February 2015, Yad Vashem recognized Edmonds as "Righteous Among the Nations," Israel's highest honor for non-Jews who risked their lives to save Jews during the Holocaust. The awards ceremony was held January 27, 2016, at the Israeli embassy in Washington, D.C., where the then-President Barack Obama praised Edmonds for action "above and beyond the call of duty," and echoed Edmonds' statement of solidarity with Jews. Chris Edmonds received the Righteous medal and certificate of honor from Israeli Ambassador Ron Dermer and Yad Vashem Council Chairman Rabbi Lau on his father's behalf at the ceremony.

"…Edmonds seemed like an ordinary American soldier, but he had an extraordinary sense of responsibility and dedication to his fellow human beings," Yad Vashem Chairman Avner Shalev.

Chris Edmonds has sought to have his father's bravery recognized with the Medal of Honor. However, the initial U.S. Army position has been that he was a captive, and therefore ineligible because his actions were not in combat. 

To overcome this obstacle, on March 23, 2016, in the U. S. House of Representatives, Rep. John J. Duncan Jr. (R-TN-2) introduced H.R. 4863, the "Roddie Edmonds Congressional Gold Medal Act" bill. The bill's original purpose was to recognize Edmonds with a Congressional Gold Medal, one of the two highest civilian awards in the United States (along with the Presidential Medal of Freedom). It was referred to the House Armed Services Committee, from where it was referred, on April 5, 2016, to the Subcommittee on Military Personnel.

On February 13, 2017, in the U. S. Senate, members from Edmonds's home state of Tennessee—U.S. Senators Lamar Alexander (R-TN) and Bob Corker (R-TN), joined by Senators Tim Kaine (D-VA) and Ben Cardin (D-MD)—introduced a bill to have Sergeant Edmonds honored with the Congressional Gold Medal.  The effort was renewed on April 21, 2021, with US Representative Tim Burchett (TN) introducing the "Master Sergeant Roddie Edmonds Congressional Gold Medal Act."  A companion bill was also introduced in the US Senate.

A historical marker honoring Edmonds was placed in Knoxville, Tennessee, on November 15, 2020.  It was donated by the Jewish American Society for Historic Preservation, with support from the Knoxville Jewish Alliance.

See also
 106th Infantry Division (United States)

References

External links
 "Roddie Edmonds" website, developed by family.
 The Righteous Among The Nations Entry at Yad Vashem database
 "Master Sgt. Roddie Edmonds honored with Yehi Or Award," video, Nov 28, 2016, Fox News, on YouTube.
 World War II Honoree at the NATIONAL WWII MEMORIAL, Washington, D.C.

American prisoners of war in World War II
American Righteous Among the Nations
American Protestants
Protestant Righteous Among the Nations
United States Army personnel of World War II
People from Knoxville, Tennessee
United States Army soldiers
Military personnel from Tennessee
1919 births

1985 deaths